Liron Vilner (born 7 February 1979) is a retired second generation Israeli footballer (the son of Yehuda Vilner) and the younger brother of Shlomi Vilner.

Honours
Israeli Youth Championship:
Winner (1): 1994-95
Youth State Cup:
Winner (1): 1996
Israeli Second Division:
Runner-up (2): 2004-05, 2006–07
Toto Cup (Leumit):
Winner (1): 2004-05
Israeli Beach Soccer League:
Runner-up (1): 2009

External links
Profile and statistics on One.co.il

Stats at Maccabi Haifa

1979 births
Living people
Israeli Jews
Israeli footballers
Maccabi Netanya F.C. players
Bnei Sakhnin F.C. players
Hapoel Haifa F.C. players
Maccabi Herzliya F.C. players
Maccabi Haifa F.C. players
Bnei Yehuda Tel Aviv F.C. players
Hakoah Maccabi Amidar Ramat Gan F.C. players
Hapoel Ra'anana A.F.C. players
Hapoel Hadera F.C. players
Maccabi HaShikma Ramat Hen F.C. players
Footballers from Netanya
Liga Leumit players
Israeli Premier League players
Association football forwards